The Canadian federal budget for fiscal year 2016-2017 was presented to the House of Commons of Canada by Finance Minister Bill Morneau on 22 March 2016. The deficit was projected to be $29.4 billion for the fiscal year 2016–2017, however this was adjusted to $17.8 billion by end of March 2017.  This was later adjusted to $19.0 billion after reflecting a change in the discount rate methodology used to determine the present value of the Government's unfunded pension obligations. The Auditor General's recommendations resulted in revisions to 10 years' worth of budget numbers. The budget also forecast that the deficit would shrink to $14.3 billion four years later.

References

External links 
2016 Budget at Department of Finance Canada

Canadian budgets
42nd Canadian Parliament
2016 in Canadian politics
Canadian federal budget
federal budget